Lepidobatrachus llanensis (common name: llanos frog; in Spanish: escuerzo) is a species of frogs in the family Ceratophryidae. It is found in northern Argentina, western Paraguay, and southern Bolivia.

Habitat and ecology
Lepidobatrachus llanensis is an aquatic frog inhabiting dry scrubland and semi-arid areas at elevations below . Breeding takes place in temporary pools and water tanks on cattle farms. During the dry season these frogs burrow underground, only to emerge again after rain. To deal with dry conditions, they form a protective cocoon that greatly reduces the loss of water.

Conservation
Lepidobatrachus llanensis is an uncommon frog living in isolated populations. It is threatened by habitat loss caused by expanding agriculture, wood extraction, and pollution. It occurs in a number of protected areas in Argentina and Paraguay.

References

llanensis
Amphibians of Argentina
Amphibians of Bolivia
Amphibians of Paraguay
Amphibians described in 1963
Taxa named by José Miguel Alfredo María Cei
Taxa named by Osvaldo Reig
Taxonomy articles created by Polbot